Larry Pack (born November 9, 1957) is an American politician, accountant, and businessman who was elected as a member of the West Virginia House of Delegates in 2020 and served until his resignation in 2022. After his resignation, Pack has worked as a senior advisor to Jim Justice.

Early life and education 
Pack was born and raised in Charleston, West Virginia. He earned a Bachelor of Science degree in accounting from the West Virginia University Institute of Technology.

Career 
From 1979 to 1991, Pack worked as a Certified Public Accountant at Herman & Company. From 1991 to 2009, he was the co-founder and partner of Pack Lambert & Burdette. Since 2009, he has been the CEO of Stonerise, a healthcare company. He also worked as secretary of the West Virginia Healthcare Association. Pack was elected to the West Virginia House of Delegates in November 2020 and assumed office on December 1, 2020.

With Chad Lovejoy, Pack managed a bipartisan workgroup aimed at reducing hunger in West Virginia.

In 2022, Pack resigned from the House of Delegates to join the Justice administration as a senior advisor.

Personal life 
Pack and his wife, Lisa, have six children and two grandchildren. Pack and his family are members of Bible Center Church, a non-denominational church in South Charleston, West Virginia. Pack also sits on the church's elder board.

References 

Living people
Members of the West Virginia House of Delegates
People from Charleston, West Virginia
Politicians from Charleston, West Virginia
West Virginia University Institute of Technology alumni
1957 births

People from Kanawha County, West Virginia